Qobu Dilağarda (also, Kobu-Dilagarda) is a village in the Fuzuli District of Azerbaijan.

Notable natives 
 Pahlivan Farzaliyev — National Hero of Azerbaijan.

References

External links 

Populated places in Fuzuli District